Farlowella curtirostra is a species of armored catfish native to the Lake Maracaibo drainage of Venezuela.  This species grows to a length of  SL.

References 
 

curtirostra
Fish of Venezuela
Endemic fauna of Venezuela
Fish described in 1942